Sclerodisca is a genus of moths belonging to the subfamily Tortricinae of the family Tortricidae.

Species
Sclerodisca hemiprasina (Diakonoff, 1952)
Sclerodisca papuana Razowski, 1964

See also
List of Tortricidae genera

References

 , 2005: World catalogue of insects volume 5 Tortricidae

External links
tortricidae.com

Tortricini
Tortricidae genera